Taagepera Church (Taagepera's Saint John's church) is a church in the village of Taagepera, Helme Parish, Valga County in southern Estonia. The building, which is made of stone and has a wooden tower, was constructed in 1674. It is located on a small hill overlooking the village of Taagepera and has an associated cemetery. It has an organ built by Ernst Carl Kessler, who made the first organ in Sitka, Alaska.

The building is registered in the Kultuurimälestiste riiklik register (National Register of Cultural Monuments) of Estonia, effective 
27 September 1999.

References

Sources
 

 

 

Former churches in Estonia
Tõrva Parish
Tourist attractions in Valga County
Churches completed in 1674
Historic sites in Estonia